Goswami is an Indian Brahmin Caste also known as the Brahmin Goswami or the Dashnam Goswami. They have the huge contribution in the writing and reading the Vedas. The Sanskrit compound Goswami may mean "lord of the senses" or lord of the Vedas (Go means Vedas). It is also pronounced as Gosains, Gossain, Gosain, Gosavi and Gossains. 

Goswami Samaj is found all over the India. and also mainly in the Nepal Country. The Caste has the ten surnames Giri, Puri, Bharti, Aashram, Saraswati, Nath, Ban, Parvat, Sagar, Tirth. 

Notable people with the surname or title Goswami include:
Goswami Tulsidas, Hindu saint and poet author of the epic Ramcharitmanas
Acharya Pt. Dr Gokulotsavji Maharaj Goswami, Indian classical singer, composer, and musicologist  of Hindustani classical music
Acharya Jnanendra Prasad Goswamy, Indian vocalist 

Acharya Radhika Prasad Goswamy, Indian Hindustani classical vocalist
Bijoy Krishna Goswami, Hindu social reformer and religious figure
Jiva Goswami, philosopher and saint from the Gaudiya Vaishnava school of Vedanta tradition
Sanatana Goswami, principal disciple of Chaitanya Mahaprabhu
 Abhishek Goswami, Indian cricketer
 Amar Goswami (1945–2012), Indian journalist and Hindi fiction writer

Omkar Goswami, Indian economist and journalist
Jitendranath Goswami, Indian scientist
 Anil Goswami, Union Home Secretary of India
Anjali Goswami, Honorary Professor of paleobiology at University College London
Arup Kumar Goswami, Indian Judge, chief justice of Andhra Pradesh High Court
 Arnab Goswami, Indian Television journalist
Ashokpuri Goswami, Gujarati poet and writer 
Abhishek Goswami, Indian cricketer
Abir Goswami, Indian actor
 Bhairavi Goswami, model
 Bindiya Goswami, actress
 Brindaban Goswami, Indian politician
Bhakti Prajnana Kesava Goswami, founder of the religious organization Sri Gaudiya Vedanta Samiti
Bhakti Vijnana Goswami, Gaudiya Vaishnava guru and a leader
Bhupendra Nath Goswami, Indian meteorologist, climatologist
B. N. Goswamy, Indian art critic, art historian
Chuni Goswami, Indian professional footballer
 Dharendra Yogi Goswami, Indo-American scholar, inventor
Dulal Chandra Goswami, Indian politician
Debashish Goswami, Indian mathematician
Debabrata Goswami, Indian chemist
 Gracy Goswami, Indian child actress
 Himanish Goswami, Indian writer, journalist, and cartoonist
Hemant Goswami, social activist
Hardwar Goswami, Gujarati language poet, writer, and playwright
 Indu Goswami, India politician
 Jhulan Goswami, ICC Women's Player of the Year 2007
 Joy Goswami, Indian Bengali-language poet
Jitendranath Goswami, Indian scientist
Karunamaya Goswami, musicologist and litterateur
Kunal Goswami, actor, businessman
 KK Goswami, television actor
 Lajja Goswami, Indian woman shooter
 Madhumita Goswami, badminton player
 Indira Raisom Goswami, Indian Assamese-language writer and Jnanpith Award winner
Manoj Kumar (born Harikrishna Giri Goswami), Bollywood actor
Mukunda Goswami, spiritual leader
Morya Gosavi, prominent saint of the Hindu Ganapatya sect
 Mohan Nath Goswami, Ashok Chakra Awardee, Para 9 commando
Manish R Goswami, television producer
 Moloya Goswami, Indian actress in Assamese-language movies and National Film Award winner
 Mamoni Raisom Goswami, Indian editor, poet, professor, scholar and writer
Mihir Goswami, Indian politician
Meenakshi Goswami, Indian film actress
Sumit Goswami, Haryanvi Singer, From Sonipat, Haryana 
Parbati Kumar Goswami, Indian Jurist, Governor of Assam and Nagaland and former Judge
Prashant Goswami, computational geoscientist, climatologist
Pitambar Deva Goswami, spiritual leader and social reformer
Prabodh Chandra Goswami, mathematician and teacher
 Rajiv Goswami, student leader
 Rama Tirtha Goswami, saint and Hindu philosopher
Ram Narayan Goswami, Indian politician
 Ramakant Goswami, Indian National Congress politician
Ravinder Goswami, Indian endocrinologist and professor
 Runki Goswami, Indian classical singer and composer
Rupa Goswami, devotional teacher (guru), poet, and philosopher of the Gaudiya Vaishnava tradition
Tamal Krishna Goswami, spiritual leader
Satsvarupa das Goswami, writer, poet, and artist
Shahana Goswami, actress
Srubabati Goswami, Indian scientist
 Shreevats Goswami, Indian cricketer
Shyam Manohar Goswami, sanskritist, philosopher, spiritual leader, reformer and guru of the Krishna-centered Pushtimarg sect of Vaishnavism
 Udita Goswami, Bollywood actress
 Vicky Goswami, Indian drug lord
 Gopala Bhatta Goswami, foremost disciple of the Vaishnavasaint, Chaitanya Mahaprabhu, and a leading historical figure in the Gaudiya Vaishnava school of Hinduism
Raghunatha Bhatta Goswami, saint and Hindu philosopher
Raghunatha dasa Goswami, Hindu saint and philosopher
Six Goswamis of Vrindavana
Suta Goswami, disciple of Vyasa

Surnames
Indian surnames
Surnames of Indian origin
Hindu surnames
Assamese-language surnames
Bengali-language surnames
Bengali Hindu surnames
Bihari-language surnames
Gujarati-language surnames